Melipotis prolata is a species of moth in the family Erebidae. It is found in North America.

The MONA or Hodges number for Melipotis prolata is 8606.

References

Further reading

 
 
 

Melipotis
Articles created by Qbugbot
Moths described in 1858